Sorenson Glacier is a glacier between Moore Dome and Rogers Spur on Bear Peninsula, flowing west into Dotson Ice Shelf on Walgreen Coast, Marie Byrd Land. Mapped by United States Geological Survey (USGS) from surveys and U.S. Navy aerial photographs, 1959–67. Named in 1977 by Advisory Committee on Antarctic Names (US-ACAN) after Jon E. Sorenson, civil engineer, USGS, a member of the satellite surveying team at South Pole Station, winter party 1975.

References

Glaciers of Marie Byrd Land